Dhirendra Premarshi is a Nepalese songwriter, journalist, and cultural expert who mostly works on Maithili language and culture. He was, most notably, awarded the Atal Mithila Samman 2019 in New Delhi, India, by Indian Defence Minister Rajnath Singh, in recognition of his prominent contribution to Maithili literature, music and media for decades.

References

Maithili writers
Writers of Mithila
Living people
21st-century Nepalese writers
Year of birth missing (living people)
People from Siraha District